This page shows the results of the Diving Competition for men and women at the 1995 Pan American Games, held from March 11 to March 26, 1995 in Mar del Plata, Argentina. There were three events, for both men and women.

Medal summary

Medal table

Medalists

Men's Events

Women's Events

Participating nations
A total of 10 nations entered divers. The numbers in parenthesis represents the number of participants entered.

See also
 Diving at the 1996 Summer Olympics

References

Events at the 1995 Pan American Games
1995
1995 in diving